Norton Cemetery is one of the city of Sheffield's many cemeteries.

Norton is a smaller cemetery running along two alleys spanning to the right and the left from the two gate houses (not listed). From the furthest graves and along the boundary wall, there are views of the Sheaf valley and the moors.

The cemetery contains 34 graves of Commonwealth service personnel, registered and maintained by the Commonwealth War Graves Commission, 27 from World War I and 7 from World War II.

References

External links

 Sheffield Bereavement
 

Norton
Grade II listed buildings in Sheffield